Rhodanobacter lindaniclasticus is a bacterium from the genus of Rhodanobacter which has been isolated from soil from a ginseng field from Poecheon in Korea.Rhodanobacter lindaniclasticus has the ability to degrade lindane.

References

Xanthomonadales
Bacteria described in 1999